Mi Estrella (My Star) is the eighth studio album by American Tejano music singer Jay Perez. The album peaked at number 13 on the US Billboard Regional Mexican Albums chart. The song "Senorita Tequila" received a nomination for Crossover Song of the Year at the 2001 Tejano Music Awards, while the album garnered Perez his first win for the Tejano Music Award for Male Vocalist of the Year after being nominated for five years.

Track listing 
Credits adapted from the liner notes of Mi Estrella.

Charts

See also 

 2000 in Latin music
 Latin American music in the United States

References

Works cited 

2000 albums
Sony Discos albums
Spanish-language albums
Jay Perez albums